Punnichy  is a village in the Canadian province of Saskatchewan within the Rural Municipality of Mount Hope No. 279 and Census Division No. 10. This village is part of the original "Alphabet Line" of the main Canadian National Railway line with Lestock to the east and Quinton to the west (the M, N, O towns have long since been deserted). Punnichy derived its name from panacay, "fledgling bird with few feathers", a Saulteaux joke referring to the appearance of a pioneer merchant.

Punnichy is located along Highway 15 in the heart of the Touchwood Hills between Quinton and Lestock. It is surrounded by four First Nation reserves: Muskowekwan, Kawacatoose, Daystar and Gordon. Punnichy was the location of one of the last operating residential schools in Canada, Gordon Indian Residential School, which closed in 1996.

Punnichy is part of the provincial constituency Last Mountain-Touchwood and federal constituency Regina—Qu'Appelle.

In 2009, Punnichy celebrated its centennial.

History 
Punnichy incorporated as a village on October 22, 1909.

Demographics 

Education

Punnichy has an elementary school, high school and a Carlton Trail Regional College centre.

Punnichy Community High School is unique within the Horizon School Division, in that it is run on the quadmester system, with 4 terms in a school year. The students take four classes in the first quadamester, two each morning and another two each afternoon. The first quadmester lasts 90 school days and the remaining 3 each last about 35 days. In the last 3 quadmesters, students take one class all morning and another all afternoon.

A satellite facility of Punnichy high school is the George Gordon Computer Education Centre located in the community centre on Gordon First Nation. The facility assists First Nations students to return to school or pick up extra classes to move into post-secondary or job training. The program is "at your own pace" and is similar to "store front" programs in urban centres.

Gordon's Indian Residential School, located in Punnichy and which closed its doors in 1996, was the last federally-funded residential school in Canada.

Notable people 
Nolan Yonkman, a defenceman for the Florida Panthers, was born in Punnichy.
Ernest Luthi, noted Saskatchewan artist
Jim Sinclair,  Indigenous political leader
 Dr. Raymond Sentes- Professor of Political Science, Anti-Asbestos Activist
Jeffery Straker, singer

See also 

 List of communities in Saskatchewan
 Villages of Saskatchewan

References

Villages in Saskatchewan
Mount Hope No. 279, Saskatchewan
Division No. 10, Saskatchewan